Jacqueline Elaine "Jacque" Reid is an American television and radio personality and journalist. She was the lead news anchor of The BET Nightly News from 2001 to 2005. Reid is currently one of the co-hosts of the NBC New York affiliate show called "New York Live." She has also guest-hosted The View several times, prior to joining NBC 4 New York.

Early career and education 
Reid began her journalism career as an anchor/reporter for WBSG-TV in Brunswick, Georgia and at CBS affiliate WKYT-TV in Lexington, Kentucky. Later, she joined KPRC-TV, the NBC affiliate in Houston, Texas. After her stint in Houston, she anchored the morning news at CNN Headline News.

Reid attended the University of Georgia before transferring to Clark Atlanta University where she earned a Bachelor of Arts degree in print journalism and a Master's degree in Broadcast journalism from Northwestern University in 1991. She is an active member of the National Association of Black Journalists. She is also a member of Delta Sigma Theta sorority.

Personal
Reid was raised in Atlanta, Georgia, graduating from Southwest Dekalb High School in 1985, and is a health and fitness enthusiast. She has said that she would like to have children. Reid maintains a busy work schedule that includes the public speaking circuit.

References

External links
Official Site

American broadcast news analysts
American radio personalities
African-American radio personalities
African-American women journalists
African-American journalists
African-American television personalities
Television personalities from Atlanta
Clark Atlanta University alumni
Medill School of Journalism alumni
Living people
American television reporters and correspondents
People from Atlanta
Radio personalities from Atlanta
Delta Sigma Theta members
American women television journalists
1975 births
21st-century African-American people
21st-century African-American women
20th-century African-American people
20th-century African-American women